William Wilfred Jenkins (3 August 1895 – 30 August 1963) was an Australian politician who represented the South Australian House of Assembly seat of Stirling from 1952 to 1963 for the Liberal and Country League.

References

 

1895 births
1963 deaths
Members of the South Australian House of Assembly
Liberal and Country League politicians
20th-century Australian politicians